ASPicDB is a database of human protein variants generated by alternative splicing, a process by which the exons of the RNA produced by transcription of a gene are reconnected in multiple ways during RNA splicing.

See also
 Alternative splicing
 Alternative splicing annotation project
 EDAS

References

External links
https://web.archive.org/web/20150131060605/http://srv00.ibbe.cnr.it/ASPicDB/

Gene expression
Spliceosome
RNA splicing
Biological databases